WildBrain Family International Limited, operating as WildBrain Spark (formerly WildBrain), is a British multi-channel network owned by the Canadian media company WildBrain (formerly DHX Media). It distributes and produces children's video content for YouTube and other digital platforms. The division officially launched in 2016; it reuses trademarks associated with WildBrain Entertainment, an animation studio that had been acquired by DHX. It maintains offices in London.

The division is responsible for distributing pre-existing material and creating original animated and live-action shorts based on properties owned by its parent company and partners. WildBrain Spark also manages the YouTube presence for a number of external brands and businesses, including Beyblade Burst, Cyber Group Studios, BRB Internacional, Benesse, Larva, Moomins, Playmobil, The Smurfs, NBCUniversal, and Warner Bros. Discovery, among others.

In September 2019, DHX Media changed its name to WildBrain, citing strong brand recognition stemming from the MCN. Concurrently, the MCN was renamed WildBrain Spark.

Productions

Akedo: Ultimate Arcade Warriors (2021–present; produced with Moose Toys)
Animal Mechanicals (2019–present) 
BFF Bright Fairy Friends (2020–present)
Boy & Dragon (2019–present)
Brum (2016)
Brum & Friends (2017–present)
Caillou: New Adventures (2017–present)
Crayola Scribble Scrubbie Pets (2020–present)
DJ Lance and the Upbeat Retreat! (2017–2018)
Eena Meena Deeka (2020–present; season 3; produced with Cosmos-Maya)
The Ellie Sparkles Show (2017)
Emojitown (2021–present; produced with Emoji Company)
Hairdorables (2018–present)
Hydro and Fluid (2018–present; season 2; produced with Alopra)
Johnny Test: The Lost Web Series (2020)
Kiddyzuzaa Land (2018–present)
Kiwi & Strit (TBA; season 3; produced with Copenhagen Bombay)
Peanuts (2018–present)
Polly Pocket (2018–present)
Popeye's Island Adventures (2018–2019)
Slugisodes (2020; produced with Epic Story Media) 
Strawberry Shortcake (2018)
Strawberry Shortcake: Berry in the Big City (2021–present; produced by WildBrain Studios)
Super Binks (2020–present; produced with Park Star Media) 
Through the Fairy Door (2019)
Tiddlytubbies (2018–present)
Teletubbies: Let's Go! (2022-present)
Tulipop (2017–2019)

Programs streaming on YouTube

Action Man (1995-1996)
The Adventures of Paddington Bear (1997-2000)
Adventures of Sonic the Hedgehog (1993-1996)
The Adventures of Super Mario Bros. 3 (1990)
Alienators: Evolution Continues (2001-2002)
Animal Mechanicals (2007-2011)
Archie's Weird Mysteries (1999-2000)
Are You Afraid of the Dark? (1992-2000)
AstroLOLogy (2018-Present)
Ben & Holly's Little Kingdom (2008-2013)
Beyblade Burst (2015-Present)
Billy Bricks (2016-Present)
Bo on the Go! (2007-2011)
Bob the Builder (1999-Present)
Boohbah (2003-2006)Brum (TV series)  (1991-2001)The Busy World of Richard Scarry (1994-1997)Caillou (1997-2010)Captain N: The Game Master (1989-1991)Cave Club (2020-Present)Chuggington (2008-Present)Curious George (2006-Present)Degrassi High (1989-1991)Degrassi Junior High (1987-1989)Degrassi: The Next Generation (2001-2015)Dennis the Menace (1986-1988)Dino Ranch (2021-Present)DinoSquad (2007-2008)Dipdap (2011)The Doodlebops (2005-2007)Double Dragon (1993-1994)Fimbles (2002-2004)Fireman Sam (1987-Present)The Fixies (2010-Present)Franny's Feet (2003-2010)Horrid Henry (2006-2019)Horseland (2006-2008)In the Night Garden... (2007-2009)Inspector Gadget (1983-2018)Instant Star (2004-2008)Johnny Test (2005-2014)Jungle Beat (2003-Present)Kid vs. Kat (2008-2011)Kongsuni and Friends (2014-2015)Kung Fu Dino Posse (2010-2011)The LA Complex (2011-2013)Larva (TV series) (2011-2019)The Legend of Zelda (1989)Liberty's Kids (2002-2003)The Little Lulu Show (1995-1999)Little People (2016-2018)Lunar Jim (2005-2007)M.A.S.K (1985-1986)Madeline (1993-2001)Mona the Vampire (1999-2006)Mr. Bean: The Animated Series (2002-2019)Mummies Alive! (1997)Open Heart (2015)Pingu (1990-2006)Pip and Posy (2021-Present)Pole Position (1984)Rainbow Ruby (2016-2020)Rev & Roll (2019)Ricky Zoom (2019-Present)Roary the Racing Car (2007-2010)The Roly Mo Show (2005-2006)Sabrina: The Animated Series (1999)Simon's Cat (2008-Present)Slugterra (2012-2016)The Smurfs (1981-1989)Sonic Underground (1999)Space Ranger Roger (2017)Spookiz (2014-Present)Strawberry Shortcake (2003-Present)Street Sharks (1994-1997)Sunny Bunnies (2015-Present)The Super Mario Bros. Super Show! (1989)Super Why! (2007-2016)Super 10 (2022-Present)Talking Tom & Friends (2012-Present)Teletubbies (1997-Present)Tobot (2010-2016)Topsy and Tim (2013-Present)Twirlywoos (2015–2017)Waffle the Wonder Dog (2018-2020)Where on Earth Is Carmen Sandiego? (1994-1999)Woody Woodpecker (1957-1997)Yo Gabba Gabba!'' (2007-Present)

References

External links
 

Multi-channel networks
Mass media companies established in 2016
British companies established in 2016
British animation studios
WildBrain
Mass media companies based in London
British subsidiaries of foreign companies